The 1988–89 League of Ireland First Division season was the fourth season of the League of Ireland First Division.

Overview
The First Division was contested by 10 teams and Drogheda United F.C. won the division.

Final table

See also
 1988–89 League of Ireland Premier Division

References

League of Ireland First Division seasons
2
Ireland